Rice Gemmell defeated Alfred Hedeman 7–5, 6–1, 6–4 in the final to win the men's singles tennis title at the 1921 Australasian Championships.

Draw

Key
 Q = Qualifier
 WC = Wild card
 LL = Lucky loser
 r = Retired

Top half

Bottom half

External links
  Grand Slam Tennis Archive – Australasian Open 1921
 

1921 in Australian tennis
Men's Singles